The Loveland Living Planet Aquarium is located in Draper, Utah, United States. It currently houses 4,500 animals representing 550 species. The public aquarium currently consists of five main exhibits.

History
The Loveland Living Planet Aquarium was founded in 1997 by Brent Andersen, a Utah native and marine biology graduate from the University of California Santa Barbara. It is a regional attraction with over 850,000 annual visitors. The initial plan was to build a  aquarium that showed ecosystems from around the world. Locations for the aquarium were considered in Salt Lake County and Utah County, and feasibility studies indicated downtown Salt Lake City would be the best location. The first education component was launched in February 1999, when the Aquavan was outfitted with educational portable marine exhibits and began visiting Utah schools.

In 2004, in order to garner support for the full-size aquarium, the young organization opened a 10,000 sq ft exhibit at the Gateway Mall in downtown Salt Lake, offering an exclusive experience of marine and freshwater life that was not then available in Utah's arid climate. The Living Planet Aquarium Preview Exhibit featured freshwater fish, sharks, stingrays, eels, a coral reef, a giant octopus, a small theater, and other interactive exhibits. Attendance reached over 150,000 visitors per year the first two years, and the small space was quickly outgrown. The Aquarium relocated in June 2006 to a much larger  space in Sandy, Utah. Attendance reached 460,000 visitors per year. The long range plan to eventually construct a campus that would house an Aquarium and a Science Learning Center continued to get support from the community over the next 4 years and in 2010 several prominent members of the business community joined to lead the Board of Trustees including Ken Murdock, Jim Loveland, Tim Cosgrove, Jeff Flamm, Rick White, Ron Nielsen, Michele Hilton and Paul Hutchinson. . The Loveland Family Foundation had been a long time donor and in 2011 presented a lead  gift that allowed the organization to accelerate fundraising, purchase 17 acres of land and raise $27 million to build the Aquarium's permanent home in Draper, Utah.. The  Loveland Living Planet Aquarium opened to the public on March 24, 2014 and saw over 1.1 million visitors in the first year of operation. The Aquarium is a 501(c)(3)non-profit organization.

Exhibits

Ocean Explorer 
The Ocean Explorer features saltwater species from all over the world, including sea jellies, eels, seahorses, and seven species of sharks. Shark species include brown-banded bamboo sharks, nurse sharks, sandbar sharks, blacktip reef sharks, whitetip reef sharks, grey reef sharks, and zebra sharks. Guests can view the sharks, sea turtles, and sting rays. The shark tunnel weighs 26,000 pounds and was lifted through the roof of the aquarium with a crane. The tunnel is made from 3.5 inch thick acrylic.

Journey to South America 
The Journey to South America is made to look like a rainforest, and houses animals such as, a 14-foot anaconda, Piranhas, caiman, desert insects, tree boas, electric eels, tree frogs, and Amazon giants. The exhibit is meant to educate guests about the biodiversity of rain forest ecosystems, the benefits rain forests provide us and how to help protect rainforest habitats.

Discover Utah 
Discover Utah houses some of Utah's threatened and endangered species such as June suckers and least chub. The largest exhibit in this gallery features three male North American river otters which serve to educate visitors about river otters, otter reintroduction efforts, and release locations in Utah.

Antarctic Adventure 
Antarctic Adventure immerses guests in a Falkland Islands research station where they will meet gentoo penguins.

Expedition: Asia 
Expedition: Asia opened on June 15, 2016. The traveling exhibit features three male Asian small-clawed otters, three Asian arowana, and many different species of Asian birds, fish, and reptiles. The main feature of Expedition: Asia are the aquarium's two roul-rouls, Roulanda and Raoul.

New Expansion

A new expansion was added to the Loveland Living Planet Aquarium. The large, alien-like structure was once used in U2's stage for their 360° World Tour. Now, visitors will have the opportunity to experience more sights and sounds in the plaza.

Community outreach
The aquarium's education department currently operates two outreach programs: the Utah Waters Van and the Rainforest Van.  The outreach programs visit over 450 elementary schools statewide each year, reaching nearly 80,000 students.  Field trip programs for pre-kindergarten through twelfth grade and a teacher professional development program with resources for fourth grade teachers are offered.

References

External links
 

2014 establishments in Utah
501(c)(3) organizations
Aquaria in Utah
Science museums in Utah
Buildings and structures in Draper, Utah
Tourist attractions in Salt Lake County, Utah